Engelbert Strauss GmbH & Co. KG, which is based in Biebergemünd, Hesse, Germany is a German brand manufacturer, mail order company and retailer that sells workwear, safety footwear and personal protective equipment.

Company 
In the beginning August Strauss and his two sons, including Engelbert (*1908) traded in brooms and brushes that were manufactured in Kassel, a district of Biebergemünd. Due to its focus on manufacturing brooms (German Besen) this district is still commonly called Besenkassel.

In 1948 after the second world war Engelbert Strauss continued the family trading tradition and founded the company bearing his name. He expanded the product range to include work protection clothing. The first products were gloves, which still play a central role in the company’s portfolio. In the 1960s the company switched to mail order business, and started its catalogue business in 1973. The product range was gradually expanded to include garments and shoes. The company started sending out catalogues in 1973. Gradually, the range was expanded to include clothing and shoes.

Today, the third and fourth generations manage the family company jointly. Engelbert's son Norbert Strauss and his two sons, Steffen and Henning Strauss, are the managing directors. The company employs around 1,500 staff.

Since the early 1990s, the company has been headquartered in Biebergemünd. In 1994 a new 40,000 sqm building with a logistics centre was built on the company grounds in Biebergemünd, around 50 km northeast of Frankfurt am Main. In 1996, Engelbert Strauss expanded and opened its first subsidiary in Austria. After the founding of a second subsidiary in England in 2002, others followed, including in the Netherlands, Belgium, Switzerland, the Czech Republic, Sweden and Denmark.

In 2020, Engelbert Strauss opened the CI Factory, another logistics and dispatch centre with its own production facilities in the immediate vicinity of its headquarters. At the Schlüchtern site, there is its own shoe factory as well as the option of customising workwear. In 2022, the Strauss CI Factory Chattogram was added as another company location in Bangladesh. The Campus in the Paddies is Workwear Academy as well as a development center for workwear with attached small series production. Together with the CI Factory Germany, the CI Factory Chattogram forms a production tandem.

The company produces in 28 countries worldwide: in Europe (14%), Asia (85%) and Africa (1%). Some of the production facilities in Asia manufacture exclusively for the company. According to their own statements, a high utilization of individual production facilities has developed due to many years of cooperation.The largest manufacturing partners are located in Laos (12% PA), Vietnam (15% PA) and Bangladesh (36% PA). 

The company is currently building another location near its headquarters in Hesse, the Alea Park resort in Bad Orb. Associated with this is a project to redesign part of the Kurpark area together with the Kurparkgesellschaft Bad Orb.

Other 
Engelbert Strauss has been a member of the Fair Wear Foundation since 2016, an independent, non-profit organisation that works with member companies and production sites to improve working conditions in the textile industry. Another partner is the Deutsche Gesellschaft für Internationale Zusammenarbeit (GIZ).

Together with GIZ, Strauss has been establishing a chair for sustainability and textile innovation at the Ahsanullah University of Science and Technology (AUST) in Bangladesh's capital Dhaka since February 2020. Other project partners are the Technical University of Dresden (TUD) and the United Nations University Institute for Integrated Management of Material Fluxes and of Resources (UNU-FLORES). In addition, Strauss has been a member of the Alliance for Sustainable Textiles since 2015. The federal government's initiative aims to make social and ecological improvements in global textile production. The company has been a Bluesign system partner since 2013 and supports the Cotton made in Africa initiative. The company claims to be committed to climate and environmental protection. In a pilot project together with Bundesforst, 1000 giant trees are to be preserved in the North Hessian Oberaula, part of the forest area can develop back into a primeval forest without forestry intervention. Strauss promotes antonius – Human Network.

Since 2010, Strauss has been a partner of the Germany national football team and a partner of the ÖFB Cup. From 2012 to 2014 the company was an advertising partner of the Four Hills Tournament and from 2012 to 2013 a sponsor of the FIM Endurance World Championship. Since 2012, the company has been an advertising partner of the DFB Cup as well as a perimeter partner of the Austria national football team. Since 2014, the company has also repeatedly acted as sponsor of the European Women's and Men's Handball Championships and the Champions Hockey League. In 2015, a sponsorship of the Swiss Super League was taken up. In the 2019/2020 DFB Cup season, the Engelbert Strauss logo was featured on the sleeves of Eintracht Frankfurt's jersey, and since the summer of 2021 there has been a cooperation with FC Bayern Munich.

In 2019, Strauss cooperated with the US rock band Metallica and outfitted the tour crew. 

Engelbert Strauss is also an official partner of the UEFA Europa League and the Europa Conference League until 2024. Together with the UEFA Foundation for children, Engelbert Strauss provided the 22 children running in with jerseys for the final in Seville. Engelbert Strauss is the official workwear partner of the men’s UEFA European Football Championship 2024 in Germany, the UEFA EURO 2024.

The company is also involved in talent development in the field of esports and works closely here with the esports player foundation. Since January 2022, Engelbert Strauss has been the main sponsor and namesake of the League of Legends league "Strauss Prime League", which functions as the game's highest-ranking league in the DACH region. 

In 2015 the company was awarded the German Logistics Prize and in 2016 it was awarded the European Logistics Prize. 

Also, the company won the prize as ‘the most popular family business’ in the category textile company and 33rd out of 100 overall.

References 

Clothing brands of Germany
Companies based in Hesse
Clothing companies established in 1948
1948 establishments in Germany